Bomprezzi is an Italian surname. Notable people with the surname include:

Franco Bomprezzi (1952–2014), Italian journalist and writer
Roberto Bomprezzi (born 1962), Italian modern pentathlete

Italian-language surnames